Liu Zhenli (born June 26, 1985 in Qingdao, Shandong) is a Chinese football goalkeeper, who plays for Qingdao Youth Island. Internationally, he played for the Chinese U-23 team and made the squad that took part in the 2008 Summer Olympics.

Club career 
Liu Zhenli started his professional football career at the beginning of the 2004 Chinese Super League season after graduating from the youth team. The following season, he would play understudy to Li Shuai who was injured near the end of the season, which allowed Liu to make his league debut on October 22, 2005 against Tianjin Teda F.C. in a 2-0 defeat. The following season, he would fight for the goalkeeping position with Li Shuai before eventually cementing himself as the first choice goalkeeper at the club in the  beginning of the 2007 Chinese Super League season.

On 7 January 2016, Liu transferred to Chinese Super League side Shandong Luneng.

International career
His impressive performances at the end of the 2007 season saw him called into the Football at the 2008 Summer Olympics – Men's tournament squad where he was second choice goalkeeper. At the tournament he played in the final group game against Brazil which China lost 3-0 as they were knocked out in the group stages.

Career statistics
.

References

External links 
Player profile at 7m.cn
Player profile at football-lineups.com
Player profile at sodasoccer.com
Player stats at sohu.com
 

1985 births
Living people
Association football goalkeepers
Chinese footballers
Footballers from Qingdao
Footballers at the 2008 Summer Olympics
Olympic footballers of China
Qingdao Hainiu F.C. (1990) players
Shandong Taishan F.C. players
Qingdao F.C. players
Chinese Super League players
China League One players
21st-century Chinese people